Assima Mall is a shopping mall in Sharq, Kuwait. It is the largest commercial project within the city, and was opened on 8 November 2021.

The Capital Complex includes the largest mall in the heart of Kuwait City. Assima Mall boasts a phenomenal lifestyle and entertainment that includes a cinema, gym, spa, and entertainment, as well as numerous dining options throughout the mall.

References

External links 
 

Shopping malls in Kuwait
2021 establishments in Kuwait
Buildings and structures in Kuwait City
Tourist attractions in Kuwait
Shopping malls established in 2021